Chutiphan Nobnorb (born 9 August 1994) is a Thai professional footballer who plays as a centre back for Thai League 2 club Rajpracha.

References

External links
 

1999 births
Living people
Chutiphan Nobnorb
Chutiphan Nobnorb
Association football defenders
Chutiphan Nobnorb
Chutiphan Nobnorb
Chutiphan Nobnorb
Samutsongkhram F.C. players
Chutiphan Nobnorb
Chutiphan Nobnorb
Chutiphan Nobnorb
Chutiphan Nobnorb
Chutiphan Nobnorb